Rajesh Khanna (born Jatin Khanna; 29 December 1942 – 18 July 2012) was an Indian actor, film producer and politician who worked in Hindi films. He is called as the "First Superstar of Hindi cinema", he consecutively starred in a record 15 solo hero successful films between 1969 and 1971. He was the highest-paid actor in Hindi cinema throughout the 1970s and 1980s. His accolades include four BFJA Awards and five Filmfare Awards, and in 2013, he was posthumously awarded the Padma Bhushan, India's third highest civilian honour.

Khanna made his debut in 1966 Aakhri Khat which was India's first official Oscar Entry in 1967. In 2005, he was honoured with the Filmfare Lifetime Achievement Award on the 50th anniversary of the Filmfare Awards. He was a Member of Parliament in the 10th Lok Sabha from New Delhi Lok Sabha constituency between 1992 and 1996, elected in the 1992 New Delhi by-election as an Indian National Congress candidate. He was married to Dimple Kapadia in March 1973, eight months before her debut film Bobby was released and had two daughters from the marriage. Their elder daughter Twinkle Khanna is an actress who is married to actor Akshay Kumar, while they also have a younger daughter Rinke Khanna.

Khanna died on 18 July 2012, after a period of illness. He has been honoured with a stamp and statue in his likeness, and a road renamed after him by the Prime Minister of India. In 2014, his biography Rajesh Khanna: The Untold Story of India's First Superstar by Yasser Usman was published by Penguin Books. In 2022, his biography "Rajesh Khanna The Most Versatile Superstar Actor of Hindi Cinema" written by Narayanan Subramanian was released. In 2018, a one kilometre fitness trail in Lajpat Nagar National Park was named after Khanna, which was inaugurated by his wife Dimple Kapadia.

Early life and background 
Rajesh Khanna was born on 29 December 1942, in Amritsar in the Punjab Province of British India, as 'Jatin Khanna' into a Punjabi Hindu Khatri family. He was adopted and raised by Chunnilal Khanna and Leelawati Khanna, who were relatives of his biological parents. His father had migrated from West Punjab to Gali Tiwarian in Amritsar. His biological parents were Lala Hiranand Khanna and Chandrani Khanna. Lala worked as headmaster of the MC High School in Burewala (in present-day Vehari District, Punjab, Pakistan). His adoptive parents belonged to a family of railway contractors who had moved from Lahore to Bombay in 1935. Khanna lived in Saraswati Niwas, in Thakur-dwar near Girgaon, Mumbai.

He attended St. Sebastian's Goan High School with his friend Ravi Kapoor, who later took the stage name Jeetendra. Khanna gradually started taking interest in theatre, did many of stage and theatre plays in his school and college days, and won many prizes in inter-college drama competitions.

In 1962 Khanna played a wounded mute soldier in the play Andha Yug and impressed with his performance; the chief guest suggested that he get into films soon. Khanna became a rare newcomer who had his own MG sports car, who once struggled to get work in theatre and films in the early 1960s.

Khanna did his first two years of Bachelor of Arts in Nowrosjee Wadia College in Pune from 1959 to 1961. Khanna later studied in K. C. College, Mumbai and Jeetendra studied from Siddharth Jain College. Khanna tutored Jeetendra for his first film audition. Khanna's uncle KK Talwar changed Khanna's first name to Rajesh when he decided to enter films. His friends and his wife called him Kaka (meaning a baby faced boy in Punjabi).

Acting career

1960s 
Rajesh Khanna was one of eight finalists from more than 10,000 contestants in the 1965 All India Talent Contest, organised by United Producers and Filmfare, along with other FTII students Subhash Ghai and Dheeraj Kumar.
 Rajesh Khanna won the contest along with Farida Jalal. BR Chopra, Bimal Roy, GP Sippy, HS Rawail, Nasir Husain, J.Om Prakash, Mohan Saigal, Shakti Samanta and Subodh Mukherji and others had created the United Producers organisation and were then judges of the contest.

He made his film debut in the 1966 film Aakhri Khat, directed by Chetan Anand, followed by Raaz, directed by Ravindra Dave, both of which were a part of his predetermined prize for winning the All-India United Producers' Talent Competition. G.P. Sippy and Nasir Hussain were the first to sign Rajesh Khanna after he won the contest.

Being under contract with United Producers, he got projects such as Aurat, Doli and Ittefaq. He was then noticed for his performances in films such as Baharon Ke Sapne, Aurat (1967), Doli, Aradhana and Ittefaq. In Bahraon Ke Sapne, the response from the public in the first week of run forced the film's ending to be changed from a tragic one to a happier one from the second week. Later, Waheeda Rehman suggested to Asit Sen to take Khanna for the lead role in Khamoshi. Through Aradhana he rose to "instant national fame" and the media referred to him as the "First Superstar of India" owing to the crazy following he got and the big crowds he could pull. However, Public Relations Officer (PRO) Tarak Nath Gandhi later confessed in a 1989 BBC interview about how they established the "Superstar" title with Rajesh Khanna, citing, "in press releases, we always wrote "Superstar" before Rajesh Khanna - "Superstar Rajesh Khanna". But the journalists used to complain and question this. So, we flattered the journalists by explaining them, talking to them nicely, by taking them out to dinner and giving them presents. In this way, we established the title "Superstar". If you keep repeating something innumerous times, it sticks." Rajesh Khanna was cast in a double role (father and son) opposite Sharmila Tagore and Farida Jalal. It also saw the resurgence of Kishore Kumar, who eventually became the official playback voice of Rajesh Khanna. They worked together until Kishore's death in 1987 and songs of their combination were released until 1991.

1970s 
In 1971, he acted in Haathi Mere Saathi, which became that year's highest-grossing film and the biggest grosser ever till then. Khanna is credited with giving Salim Khan and Javed Akhtar their first chance to become screenplay writers by offering them work in Haathi Mere Saathi. Javed Akhthar accepted and said in an interview: "One day, he went to Salimsaab and said that Mr. Devar had given him a huge signing amount with which he could complete the payment for his bungalow Aashirwad. But the film's script was far from being satisfactory. He told us that if we could set right the script, he would make sure we got both money and credit." Rajesh bought Rajendra Kumar's bungalow named Dimple in Carter Road Promenade for 31 lakhs in 1970 and renamed it Ashirwaad. Incidentally, Rajendra Kumar himself had purchased it from another superstart of yesteryears Bharat Bhushan.

Rajesh Khanna had 15 consecutive solo hit films between 1969 and 1971. These were Aradhana, Doli, Bandhan, Ittefaq, Do Raaste, Khamoshi, Safar, The Train, Kati Patang, Sachaa Jhutha, Aan Milo Sajna, Mehboob Ki Mehendi, Choti Bahu, Anand and Haathi Mere Saathi. He had 17 consecutive hit films as the lead hero from 1969 to 1971 which included 15 solo hero films and 2 non-solo hero films; Andaz and Maryada.

Badnam Farishte in 1971 was unsuccessful at the box office. In 1972, Khanna acted in 11 releases including the Telugu film Bangaru Babu. That year, his films, Amar Prem, Apna Desh and Mere Jeevan Saathi earned more than Rs.5 crore together. His other films of 1972 such as Dil Daulat Duniya, Bawarchi, Joroo Ka Ghulam and Shehzada earned more than Rs.4.5 crores. His next release Anuraag was a hit. The film Maalik released in end of 1972 was unsuccessful. He made a guest appearance in a Telugu movie called Bangaru Babu, directed by V.B. Rajendra Prasad in 1973, which was a hit at the box office.In 1972, he had 9 consecutive hit films.

As per the review of Raja Rani written in 2014 by The Hindu newspaper, the film did well at the box office and, taking into consideration the inflation as of 2014, the film would have grossed more than 100 crores. The attire worn by Khanna was a sleeveless shirt and trousers, thick leather belt, shoes without socks and a black cap.The Hindu review noted "On a lesser actor, the attire would have fallen flat, but Khanna, as a small time thief, carries it with characteristic élan."

Rajesh acted alongside Mumtaz in eight films. They were neighbours and got along very well, which translated onto the screen. Mumtaz stated "I would pull his leg and tease him about his fan following. Whenever Rajesh entered a hotel in Madras, there was a queue of 600 girls waiting to see him at midnight. As a result, even I would get some importance, as people would ask for my autograph as well. He was very generous with his associates, and would party a lot."

During the peak of his career he would be mobbed during public appearances. Fans kissed his car, which would be covered with lipstick marks, and lined the road, cheering and chanting his name. Female fans sent him letters written in their blood. There used to be a line of cars of his producers and hysterical fans outside his bungalow every day. Actor Mehmood parodied him in Bombay to Goa where the driver and conductor of the bus were called 'Rajesh' and 'Khanna' respectively. Even today, he remains the favourite of mimicry artists, who copy his trademark style and dialogue delivery.

During the filming of Amar Prem there was a scene that needed to be shot at Howrah Bridge with a boat carrying Khanna and Sharmila under the bridge. The authorities ruled this scene out as they realised that if the public found out that the star would be there, it may create problems on the bridge and that it might collapse due to the number of people trying to get a glimpse of their favourite actor. Film critic Monojit Lahiri remembers "Girls married themselves to photographs of Rajesh Khanna, cutting their fingers and applying the blood as sindoor. Rajesh was God, there has never been such hysteria."

In the year 1974, the Filmfare Awards were held honouring the films released in the year 1973. Khanna was nominated for his performance in a complicated role in Daag. However, Rishi Kapoor received the Best Actor award for his jolly, schoolboyish debut role in Bobby, Khanna did not win the award for his performance in Daag.

Several songs sung by Kishore Kumar in the 1970s were based on Rajesh Khanna. During the filming of the song "Mere Sapnon Ki Rani" in Aradhana, Sharmila Tagore was shooting for a Satyajit Ray film and director Shakti Samanta had to shoot their scenes separately and then join the scenes together. In the 1970s, his chemistry with Sharmila Tagore, Mumtaz, Asha Parekh, Zeenat Aman, Tanuja and Hema Malini were also popular with audiences.

In 1973, BBC also made a documentary on him named as Bombay Superstar as a part of their Man Alive series. Shooting began when he got married and his film Daag premiered. In the video it can be noticed that Khanna was shooting for Aap Ki Kasam. A textbook prescribed by the Mumbai University contained an essay, "The Charisma of Rajesh Khanna!"

Sharmila Tagore said in an interview to The Indian Express that "women came out in droves to see Kaka. They would stand in queues outside the studios to catch a glimpse, they would marry his photographs, they would pull at his clothes. Delhi girls were crazier for him than Mumbai girls. He needed police protection when he was in public. I have never seen anything like this before or since."

Music remained one of the biggest attractions of all Rajesh Khanna films throughout his career. His films were always known for the music with chartbuster soundtracks. The reason for this was that Khanna used to personally sit in music sessions with music directors such as Kalyanji Anandji, R. D. Burman, Shankar Jaikishen, Lakshmikant Pyarelal, S.D. Burman, Bappie Lahiri and select tunes for duets and solo songs in his films. He used to be personally present for recording of the solo songs to be picturised on him.

Many of the musical scores for Khanna's films were composed by Laxmikant–Pyarelal, Sachin Dev Burman and R. D. Burman. The trio of Rajesh Khanna, Kishore Kumar and R.D. Burman went on to make a number of popular films, including Kati Patang, Amar Prem, Shehzada, Apna Desh, Mere Jeevan Saathi, Aap Ki Kasam, Ajnabee, Namak Haraam, Maha Chor, Karm, Phir Wohi Raat, Aanchal, Kudrat, Ashanti, Agar Tum Na Hote, Awaaz, Hum Dono and Alag Alag.

Khanna considered Guru Dutt, Meena Kumari and Geeta Bali to be his idols. Khanna said in an interview: "My inspirations include Dilip Kumar's dedication and intensity, Raj Kapoor's spontaneity, Dev Anand's style and Shammi Kapoor's rhythm."

Between 1976 and 1978, Khanna acted in seven films that were not commercially successful.  These films included Mehbooba, Bundal Baaz, Tyaag, Palkon Ki Chhaon Mein, Naukri, Chakravyuha and Janta Hawaldar, which were directed by Shakti Samanta, Shammi Kapoor, Din Dayal Sharma, Meraj, Hrishikesh Mukherjee, Basu Chatterjee and Mehmood Ali, respectively. Khanna persuaded Samanta to cast his sister-in-law Simple Kapadia opposite him in Anurodh. Films starring Rajesh Khanna and directed by Shakti Samanta tended to be commercially successful, but Mehbooba was an exception. The change from romantic and social movies to action oriented multi-starrers caused some decline of Khanna's career in terms of box office ratings. The declaration of emergency in India had angered the masses and this helped films having the lead character revolting against corruption [and establishment] to become successes. Actor Joy Mukherjee made Chhailla Babu, a suspense thriller in 1977, which became the only successful film of his as a director, and the unexpected success of Chhailla Babu gave a boost to the career of Khanna. However, Khanna continued basically in solo-hero socially sober household meaningful films during this era and played a variety of characters in films of various genres. During this phase too he had box office hits like Maha Chor, Anurodh, Bhola Bhala, Tinku and Karm.

Khanna was the first choice of director Raj Kapoor for the lead role in Satyam Shivam Sundaram, but some members from the Raj Kapoor camp opposed his presence. Many other reasons are stated but the role eventually went to Shashi Kapoor.

1980s 
After 1978, Khanna starred in films like such as Amar Deep, Phir Wohi Raat, Bandish, Thodisi Bewafaii, Dard, Kudrat, Dhanwan, Ashanti (1982 film), Avtaar, Agar Tum Na Hote, Souten, Jaanwar, Asha Jyoti, Awaaz, Naya Kadam, Hum Dono, Babu, Aaj Ka M.L.A. Ram Avtar, Shatru, Insaaf Main Karoonga, Anokha Rishta, Nazrana, Angaarey, Adhikar, Amrit, Awam and Rupaye Dus Karod. Director Bharathiraja decided to remake his 1978 Tamil box office hit film Sigappu Rojakkal in Hindi with Khanna playing a psychopath. Kamal Haasan who played the same role in Tamil won South Filmfare Best Actor Award for his portrayal. But the Hindi film Red Rose (1980) was seen as controversial by traditional and orthodox Hindi moviegoers and was not a commercial success.

Tina Munim and Rajesh Khanna became an on and off screen couple of the eighties with movies such as Fiffty Fiffty, Souten, Suraag, Aakhir Kyon?, Bewafai, Insaaf Main Karoonga, Alag Alag and Adhikar. Ram Awatar Agnihotri wrote that Tina Munim showed the first sparks of the dedicated actress she would become in the films Alag Alag and Adhikar, both with Khanna. His on-screen pairings with Shabana Azmi, Smita Patil, Padmini Kolhapure and Poonam Dhillon were also popular in the eighties. He also acted in the Marathi hit film Sundara Satarkar in 1981.

Kamal Haasan was a close friend of Khanna. Khanna starred in Hindi remakes of 3 Tamil films originally starring Kamal, and Kamal acted in 2 remakes of Khanna's films. Kamal quoted in an interview, to narrate how he experienced Khanna's stardom in an incident in 1985 – "He probably hadn't been to a public theatre since he became a star. When we reached, things were okay. He enjoyed the mediocre film (The Swarm) thoroughly and refused to leave until the end titles. That's when I panicked. This was Rajesh Khanna, the star of the millennium. If audiences got to know he was present there would be a stampede and blood on my hands. But Mr Khanna refused to listen. He stayed on till the end. The inevitable happened after the show. All hell broke loose as audiences realised he was there. I became Rajesh Khanna's bodyguard and security officer as I took him through the crowd. His shirt was torn, but he was enjoying himself thoroughly. He giggled and chuckled like a child."

Khanna performed in successful multi-star films including Rajput, Dharm Aur Qanoon, Paapi Pet Ka Sawaal Hai, Zamana, Dil-E-Nadaan and Ghar Ka Chiraag. He did three movies with Jeetendra: Dharam Kanta, Nishaan and Maqsad. In 1984, Maqsad was the second-highest ranked film in terms of box office results, earning gross 8.5 crores. In Aaj Ka M.L.A. Ram Avtar, Khanna played the character of a corrupt politician. Viewers praised his role in the film. In 1985 he produced Alag Alag. According to The Guardian (UK), he had 11 releases as solo lead hero in the year 1985 and eight of them were hits. In 1985, the film Bewafai, with Khanna as the lead hero and Rajinikanth in a negative role, released and became a success and grossed Rs 11.95 crore at the box office that year. Before joining politics, one of his last films as the lead hero was Swarg, released in 1990. David Dhawan regards Swarg as his favourite directorial venture. In the year 1991, he starred in films – Ghar Parivaar, Rupaye Dus Karod and Begunaah as the lead hero.

He worked in films of different genres: tragedy in Babu as a rickshaw puller, thriller in Red Rose as a psychopath, political adventure in Awam, fantasy in Bundalbaaz and Jaanwar, crime in Phir Wohi Raat and Angarey, suspense in Chakravyuha and Ittefaq, comedy in Joru Ka Ghulam, Bawarchi, Hum Dono and Masterji, action in Ashanti and Zamana, and family dramas addressing different issues in Aanchal, Amrit and Agar Tum Na Hote and films addressing issues of social concerns; Avtaar, Naya Kadam and Akhir Kyun. He did films of different themes such as reincarnation in Kudrat, spiritualism in Maalik and immaturity while falling in love in Anokha Rishta, Nazrana and Dil E Nadan. He played a variety of characters as the lead hero: a postman in Palkon Ki Chaon Mein, a lawyer who proves that his senior has committed a rape 25 years earlier in Kudrat, a politician in Aaj Ka MLA Ram Avtaar, a young musician forced by fate to marry two women in Asha Jyoti, a professional advocate in Awaaz, a fisherman in Prem Bandhan, a patriot in Prem Kahani, a righteous farmer in Bandhan and a Muslim who falls in love with a prostitute's daughter in Mehboob Ki Mehendi.

The main difference between him and his predecessors, successors, contemporaries was that Khanna's films ran successfully in whole of India and not just Hindi speaking areas and he did films of every genre simultaneously and has more critically acclaimed films to his credit than all other Hindi Actors of every generation.
 Khanna was the among the few actors who could manage to strike a balance between different kinds of cinema and remain popular with both kinds of audiences –  masses and classes for displaying his craft.

He shared close relationships with R. D. Burman and Kishore Kumar. The trio were friends and have worked together in thirty-two films. Kishore Kumar had even credited Rajesh Khanna for his resurgence, so much so that he sang for Alag Alag, the first film produced by Rajesh Khanna without charging anything. In 1985 Pancham found himself being sidelined after failures of a few films, but Rajesh Khanna was among the few who continued to stand by him. Rajesh and Pancham worked together even after the death of Kishore in the films Jai Shiv Shankar, the unreleased film Police Ke Peechhe Police (both produced by Khanna) and Sautela Bhai. Khanna even helped Leena Gangully and Amit Kumar in completing Mamta Ki Chhaon Mein, the last film directed by Kishore, who died before the completion of the film. R.D. Burman had quoted in an interview –  "I have always reserved the best music tunes for Kaka and I dont feel guilty about it, as he deserves it. Although Amitabh Bachchan was a fine actor, it will be Kaka who would be remembered forever and stay immortal".

Pyarelal of the Laxmikant–Pyarelal duo quoted in an interview that "Rajesh Khanna was lucky for us and we were lucky for him too. From the 1969 film Do Raaste to the 1986 film Amrit, we gave hits together both as films and as music scores.... When we went on our first overseas concert tour in 1984, he came and danced to three songs. He was very particular about his music and would take a tape home if he could not assess a song. He would then give his feedback after a day or two. But if he liked a song at the sitting, he would loudly shout "Wah! Wah!" in appreciation.... It was God's blessing that we came up with such a vast range of hit songs for him, including in his home productions Roti and films like Sachaa Jhutha, Chhailla Babu, Chakravyuha, Fiffty Fiffty, Amar Deep, Bandish, Asha Jyoti and Anurodh. Incidentally, he had a stake in Mehboob Ki Mehndi too. He had great interest in music and a terrific sense of melody too. His music is dominated by Pancham (R.D. Burman) and us and we accepted Shakti Samanta's Anurodh only because Rajesh Khanna had some misunderstanding with Pancham then, and did not want to work with him." Khanna would always request music directors to fit in Kishore Kumar wherever possible. In fact, Kishore was very reluctant to sing "Waada Tera Waada" in Dushman and suggested to Laxmikant-Pyarelal to get it sung by Rafi. Then Laxmikant made Kishore meet Rajesh Khanna and Khanna winked at Laxmikant and told Kishore that in that case the song should be scrapped. On hearing this, Kishore immediately agreed to sing it by himself for Khanna.

Actors who were part of the cast of most of his films include Ashok Kumar, Sujit Kumar, Prem Chopra, Madan Puri, Asrani, Bindu, Vijay Arora, Roopesh Kumar, Dina Pathak and A. K. Hangal, who remained part of his "working team" from the start until the late eighties. The lyricist whom he preferred for his movies was Anand Bakshi. Films by Shakti Samanta with Khanna in the lead, music by Pancham and lyrics by Anand Bakshi had people swooning. The films Samanta directed without Khanna in the eighties were duds. His other close friends from the film industry include Raj Babbar, J. Om Prakash, Prem Chopra and D. Rama Naidu and Jeetendra.

Celebrities of the post-2000 era, like Madhur Bhandarkar, say that they take at least three or four turns in Carter Road at that time, just to see Khanna. The younger generation stars like Imran Khan still regard Rajesh Khanna as someone who would take the top slot as the most romantic hero of all time. Shah Rukh Khan idolises Rajesh Khanna and has opined; "Rajesh Khanna, you can't touch". Anupam Kher said "Kishore Kumar, Sanjeev Kumar, S. D. Burman, R. D. Burman, Rajesh Khanna and Smita Patil changed the face of Indian cinema. They're remembered by the films that they did." Actor Tom Alter confessed "I still dream of being Rajesh Khanna. For me, in the early 1970s, he was the only hero – romantic to the core, not larger than life, so Indian and real – he was my hero; the reason I came into films and he still is." Actor Irrfan Khan stated in an interview, "The kind of craze witnessed by Rajesh Khanna has not been duplicated by anyone. He was the biggest and the most real star Bollywood has produced. I'd say stardom is that feeling of being possessed by your idol; you are so overwhelmed with euphoria you lose touch with reality." The trend of wearing guru kurtas and belts on shirts became famous in the seventies and eighties because of Khanna. Javed Akhthar, in an interview, told about his experience with Khanna's stardom: "Bangalore used to have a state lottery and the government asked him to draw the lucky number. They organised it in a stadium. I was with him as we were discussing some scripts. I don't know if I will experience that again, the sound of 50,000 people gasping (when they saw him). He was like Caesar. It was unbelievable". Actor Salman Khan has told in many interviews that he or Aamir or Shahrukh have not even achieved 10 percent of kind of achievements Khanna had in field of acting or his stardom.

1990–2011 
While serving as Congress M.P. from 1991 to 1996, he returned to acting, playing the lead in Khudai (1994), which was about a father and son both falling in love with the same woman. In 1990, Khanna also worked in the blockbuster Swarg starring Govinda & Juhi Chawla, where he was seen portraying a patron to the character played by the lead. After 1992, he appeared in only 10 films and declined most film offers. He made a comeback as an NRI in Aa Ab Laut Chalen (1999), and Kyaa Dil Ne Kahaa (2002) and played the solo lead in the films Sautela Bhai in 1996, Pyar Zindagi Hai in 2001, Kaash Mere Hote in 2009, Wafaa in 2008 and Riyasaat in 2010. He did 4 television serials in the period 2000–2009.

He appeared in a rare interview in the show Aap Ki Adalat in 1992, where he quoted to the interviewer Rajat Sharma,
"I would just ask if I am arrogant, how come all these producers made so many films with me. My fans who turned this actor into a superstar would have never accepted me if I was arrogant. If I was arrogant people would not have made me a Lok Sabha member because if someone is arrogant, that arrogance is visible. And this public knows everything and understand everything".

Khanna was a life member of the International Film And Television Research Centre, the International Film And Television Club and the Asian Academy of Film & Television. He was Faculty Guest of "Specialised Cinema Courses At Asian School Of Media Studies". On 10 April 1999 Khanna inaugurated the live concert of S. P. Balasubrahmanyam, held at Lal Bahadur Shastri Stadium, Hyderabad as a tribute to R. D. Burman. In 2001 and 2002, Rajesh played the lead in two television serials: Aapne Parai (B4U and DD Metro) and Ittefaq (Zee TV). He performed in a video album based on Tagore's songs (Rabindra Sangeet) without payment. He also endorsed Star se Superstar tak – a talent hunt programme in 2007 and donated a Gold Trophy of Rs.1 crore. In its Silver Jubilee Episode on 14–15 March 2008, K for Kishore aired a Rajesh Khanna special. He signed on to star in a TV serial with Creative Eye Banner, (Dhiraj Kumar) in 2007, and in 2008 performed in a TV serial, Bhabhima, with Leena Ganguly as his co-star. His successful TV serial Raghukul Reet Sada Chali Aayi began in November 2008 and ended in September 2009. Khanna cited the lack of good roles for actors like him in films as the reason for him not appearing much in films after 2001. He said in an interview on being queried about his decision to do TV serials: "The reach of TV is much more than cinema today and one episode of my serial is likely to be watched by more people than a super-hit film". In 2009, on his 67th birthday, Shemaroo Entertainment released his films and a song collection titled Screen Legends-Rajesh Khanna-the Original Superstar. In May 2012, Havells, the fan making company endorsed Khanna as Brand Ambassador for their new ad campaign featuring him in solo advertisements.

Political and business career 

At the insistence of Rajiv Gandhi, he started campaigning for Congress after 1984. In the election for New Delhi seat in the 1991 Lok Sabha election, Khanna lost to L.K. Advani by a narrow margin of 1589 votes, after which Khanna stood on the grounds at the counting station insisting that he had been cheated of a win. In 1992, a by-election was called after the resignation of the incumbent Member of Parliament L.K. Advani. Khanna contested the seat again, won the by-election by defeating Shatrughan Sinha by 25,000 votes. Rajesh Khanna was a member of Parliament for the Indian National Congress, from the New Delhi constituency, where he won the 1992 by-election, retaining his seat until 1996 after which he was not interested in active politics. When Khanna was MP, he did not accept new acting assignments, but only acted in the film Khudai (1994). After leaving parliament, he was a political activist for the INC and campaigned for the party till the 2012 Punjab election.

Khanna and a group of foreign investors bought land in Shirdi in which built a religious resort for disciples of Sai Baba of Shirdi.

Personal life 
In the late 1960s and early 1970s, Khanna fell in love with the then fashion designer and actress Anju Mahendru. They were in a relationship for seven years. Khanna's sudden stardom and his insistence that Mahendru quit her acting career eventually ended their relationship. Mahendru states that the couple did not speak to each other for 17 years after the break-up. Later Khanna - 31 at that time - married the budding actress Dimple Kapadia who was then 15 years old,  in March 1973, before Kapadia's debut film Bobby released in September that year.  Khanna and Kapadia have two daughters from the marriage; Twinkle and Rinke. Khanna and Kapadia separated in 1982, but never completed the divorce proceedings. According to Yasser Usman's biography of Khanna, the couple separated because Kapadia wished to return to acting. She had quit acting when she married Khanna since the latter wanted his partner to be a housewife. A few years after their marriage Kapadia decided to resume her career. However, Khanna remained adamant that his wife will not work. Kapadia eventually left Khanna and started her career in films. In the 1980s, Tina Munim was in love with Rajesh Khanna. Munim had been a fan of Rajesh since her school days. They appeared in ten films together between 1981 and 1986. According to website Bollywood Mantra reporter,  Khanna refused to marry her as their marriage would have a bad impact on his daughters. Khanna and Kapadia however maintained an amicable relationship where they both were seen together at parties and family functions. Kapadia also campaigned for Khanna's election and worked in his film Jai Shiv Shankar (1990), although the film never got released. After Tina Munim's exit, Khanna resumed his friendship with Anju Mahendru.

Khanna's elder daughter Twinkle Khanna, an interior decorator and a former film actress, is married to actor Akshay Kumar, while his younger daughter Rinke Khanna, also a former Hindi film actress, is married to a London-based investment banker Samir Saran. On 17 July 2012, a woman named Anita Advani claimed that she had been Khanna's live-in partner, and sent a legal notice to his family members asking for compensation. The family denied the claims.

His closest friends from the industry included Raj Kapoor, Dilip Kumar, Mumtaz, Shashi Kapoor, Sanjeev Kumar, Kishore Kumar, R.D. Burman, Anand Bakshi, Sharmila Tagore, D. Rama Naidu, Prem Chopra, Manoj Kumar, Ashok Kumar and Jeetendra. He also maintained cordial relationships with Asha Parekh, Zeenat Aman, Dev Anand, Yash Chopra, Dharmendra, Hema Malini, Rishi Kapoor and Rakesh Roshan. In his later years, he became friendlier with Amitabh Bachchan, who was billed as his main rival in the 1970s and 1980s.

Illness and death 

In June 2012, it was reported that Rajesh Khanna's health had been deteriorating for some time. On 23 June he was admitted to Lilavati Hospital in Mumbai due to health complications. He was discharged on 8 July from the hospital and was reportedly fine.

On 14 July, Khanna was readmitted to the Lilavati Hospital, but was discharged on 16 July. He died on 18 July 2012, at his bungalow, Aashirwad, in Mumbai. Sources confirmed that his health had been deteriorating since July 2011 as he was diagnosed with cancer. After his death his co-star Mumtaz said that he was suffering from cancer for the duration of the prior year and had undergone chemotherapy sessions. His funeral took place on 19 July at 11:00. His funeral was attended by 9 lakh people and his fans had come from places like Surat, Ahmedabad, and even from foreign countries as well. Police had to resort to lathi-charge to control the crowd of fans who had gathered for the procession from his Bandra house to the crematorium. He died in the presence of his wife Dimple Kapadia, daughters Rinke Khanna and Twinkle Khanna, son-in-law Akshay Kumar, Grandchildren, Anju Mahendru and other close relatives. His pyre was lit by his grandson, Aarav, with the assistance of Akshay Kumar.
 Amitabh Bachchan cited that Rajesh Khanna's last words were "Time is up, Pack up". In his special pre-recorded message to his family, friends and fans which was played on his "chautha", he thanked and saluted his friends and fans for the love they showered on him and also shared as to how he became a successful actor without having any godfather behind him. On 25 July 2012, his ashes were immersed in the Ganges at Rishikesh, Uttarakhand by his wife Dimple Kapadia and daughter Rinke Khanna.

Influence and legacy 
The President of India, Pratibha Patil lamented the passing away of the actor. In a press release she said "I am saddened to learn about the passing away of Rajesh Khanna. In his prime as an actor he was the heartthrob of the young generation of 1970s, who tried to model themselves on him and his style." Prime Minister Dr. Manmohan Singh and Narendra Modi who used to Chief Minister of Gujarat mourn on his death. Many celebrities including Amitabh Bachchan, Shah Rukh Khan, Aamir Khan, Karan Johar, Shabana Azmi, Rishi Kapoor and many politicians also paid homage to him after his death. His prayer meeting, organised in a grand way at the Taj Land's End hotel in Bandra, Mumbai on 21 July 2012, was attended by many.  

A postage stamp featuring Khanna was released by the India Post on 3 May 2013. On his first death anniversary, a bronze statue of Rajesh Khanna was unveiled at Bandra Bandstand, Mumbai. A chowk (intersection) in Girgaon has been named "Superstar Rajesh Khanna Chowk" in his memory. A Park at Lajpat Nagar, New Delhi has been renamed as Superstar Rajesh Khanna Park in his memory.

Awards and nominations 

Khanna won seven All-India Critics Association (AICA) Best Actor Awards, and received 10 nominations. He won four Best Actor Awards in the Bengal Film Journalists' Association Awards, and received 25 nominations. He won three Filmfare Best Actor Awards, one Filmfare Special Guest Actor Award in 1973, and received a Filmfare Special Award in 1991, after 25 years in the Hindi film industry. He received the Filmfare Lifetime Achievement Award at the 50th anniversary Filmfare Awards ceremony in 2005. He also received the IIFA Lifetime Achievement award in 2009.

Filmography

Producer

Co-producer

Playback singer

Further reading

References

External links 

 
1942 births
2012 deaths
Indian male film actors
Male actors in Hindi cinema
Film producers from Punjab, India
Male actors from Amritsar
Punjabi people
Filmfare Awards winners
Filmfare Lifetime Achievement Award winners
Bollywood playback singers
Bengal Film Journalists' Association Award winners
Indian actor-politicians
Indian male television actors
India MPs 1991–1996
Indian male singers
Male actors from Mumbai
Indian male soap opera actors
Recipients of the Padma Bhushan in arts
Indian National Congress politicians from Punjab, India
Lok Sabha members from Delhi
20th-century Indian singers
Indian male playback singers
Politicians from Amritsar
Singers from Punjab, India
Hill Grange High School alumni
Punjabi Hindus